Adam Smoluk (born June 17, 1980) is a Canadian screenwriter, director, actor, community leader, and executive. His work in media productions often explores themes of alienation and isolation.

Early life 
Adam Smoluk was born and raised in Winnipeg, Manitoba and grew up in the St. Vital area.  As a child he developed a passion for the arts, specifically photography, writing, and theatre.  After seeing Singin' in the Rain, Smoluk was in awe of the production elements of the film and said he was "blown away with the magic of film -- it was quite captivating."  He was twelve years old when he purchased a used Pentax K1000 SLR camera from a neighborhood garage sale and begin learning about lighting and photography. 

In high school he became interested in playwriting, and after graduation studied theatre on scholarship at the British American Drama Academy at Oxford University. Upon returning home to Canada, he began working as an actor in film and television. He attended McMaster University, a public research university located in Hamilton, Ontario, Canada and graduated with a diploma in Business Administration. He graduated with honours from Red River College (RRC)'s Human Resource Management and Management Development programs and earned a Chartered Professional in Human Resources (CPHR) designation and a Society for Human Resource Management (SHRM-SCP) designation. He was selected to RRC's 2017 billboard campaign for distinguished alumni. He was awarded a Royal Bank of Canada scholarship to attend governance training with the Rotman School of Management and the Institute of Corporate Directors.

Community service 
Smoluk has been active in the Alliance of Canadian Cinema, Television and Radio Artists (ACTRA) and has served on the ACTRA Manitoba Political Action Committee, and was Chairman of the ACTRA Independent Film Committee. In 2007, he was appointed to serve as ACTRA's representative on the Manitoba Federation of Labour's Human Rights Committee. In 2012, Smoluk contributed profiles of the Right Honourable Edward Schreyer and Manitoba Film & Music CEO Carole Vivier for The Winnipeg Chamber of Commerce's The Heart of Winnipeg, a book that profiles 41 Manitoban-based leaders. The publication profiles leaders who have contributed to growth and development of Manitoba. In 2013, Smoluk was awarded the Manitoba Federation of Labour's Al Cerilli scholarship award. The MFL's Young Members Committee selects the winner on the basis of their record of commitment to the labour movement.
Smoluk was appointed to the Board of Directors for Winnipeg's Westland Foundation, a scholarship program to support youth from Winnipeg's inner city to attend post-secondary educational institutes. He is a former member of the Board of Directors of the Winnipeg Film Group and served on the United Way of Winnipeg's GenNext Council. Smoluk was named chair of GenNext in October 2015  and he was a key organizer of the first GenNext Summit ever held in Canada. In 2019, he was appointed to the Advisory Committee for Reel Canada, which promotes Canadian Cinema.

Career 
Smoluk made his debut feature film, Horsethieves which was completed on a shoestring budget and was awarded the Audience Choice Award at the 2005 Winnipeg International Film Festival. Smoluk was awarded an Investors Group scholarship for leadership studies at The Banff Centre, and received the Future Leaders of Manitoba award for the Arts. 

Smoluk was the youngest filmmaker ever selected to the National Screen Institute's Features First Program. 
In 2009, Smoluk went into production of his second feature film, Foodland. The film follows a naïve grocery clerk as his life spirals out of control when he inadvertently helps his inept manager rob the store. Foodland'''s cast includes James Clayton (Actor), Ross McMillan, Stephen Eric McIntyre and Kim Poirier. The film was released in select cities in January 2011. Super Channel, Canada's only national English pay television network, premiered Foodland in October 2011.  The network profiled the film in the Super Channel Gems selections.  Foodland premiered on the IFC in March 2014.

Smoluk was awarded selection by an international jury to attend the eQuinoxe Europe screenwriting development program in Lindau, Germany in October 2016. He directed multiple episodes of the true crime television series, In Plain Sight for the Discovery Channel. 

In 2019, Film Training Manitoba (FTM) appointed Smoluk as the managing director and in this new role, he was made responsible for all operations, financial and training activities at the Winnipeg-headquartered organization. At the time of his appointment, he was the youngest senior executive in the Province of Manitoba’s Department of Economic Development's Sector Council Program. He led FTM's first rebranding of its logo and colors in twenty years, as well as growth from approximately 100 to 200 participants annually to 1,400 individuals undertaking FTM's training programs. 

In 2020, Smoluk and the National Screen Institute (NSI)'s CEO Joy Loewen launched a joint partnership between NSI and FTM to bring a combination of educational programming including distance learning, in-class training, career consulting and outreach to Indigenous creators and Manitoba’s northern communities. 
 
Smoluk delivered the 2020 commencement addresses at two of his alma maters, McMaster University and Red River College.

Economic Development Winnipeg profiled Smoluk's FTM and ACTRA Manitoba's inaugural BIPOC (Black, Indigenous, People of Colour) Performers Training Initiative. The CBC and BET+ series, The Porter, which started shooting in Winnipeg in May 2021, was a catalyst for FTM to create five virtual courses specifically targeting BIPOC talent. Noting the initiative as a huge success, the profile highlighted that the sessions went beyond what organizers imagined with 108 spots filled. Smoluk commented that “This initiative allows us (Canadians) to grow our workforce, not just for performers, but for other key needed areas in film and television.”

In the fall of 2021, Smoluk's Film Training Manitoba announced the creation of the Summit for Women in Film Trades (SWIFT), which was set to take place at Red River College Polytechnic’s new Innovation Centre in January 2022. The goal of the conference — which is the first in Canada to focus on film trades — was to encourage more women to join the film industry while providing training and networking opportunities for current female film professionals.

“It does have potential economic challenges for industry because when you want to carry out large-scale film productions, there’s a cost to bring people from out of province to fill those labour voids,” said Smoluk. “If you can improve on (the percentage of female staff), you’re going to do a lot as an organization to bring more people into the industry and deal with that.”

Filmography

As writer/director/producer
 Horse Thieves (2005)
 Foodland (2010)
 In Plain Sight (2019)

As actor
Film
 Monster in the Coal Bin (1989) as Furby
 Zeyda and the Hitman (2004) as Young Nathan
 Horse Thieves (2005) as Erland Eastly
 Black Bridge (2006) as Adrian Downing

Television
 Everybody's Doing It (2002) as Bobby
 The Atwood Stories (1 episode, 2003) as Rodney
 2030 CE (6 episodes, 2002–2003) as Scotch
 In the Dark (2003) as Jimmy
 While I Was Gone (2004) as Larry
 Less Than Kind'' (1 episode, 2010) as Young Doctor

References

External links 

Canadian male screenwriters
Film directors from Winnipeg
Writers from Winnipeg
1980 births
Canadian people of Polish descent
Canadian people of Ukrainian descent
Living people
Alumni of the British American Drama Academy